This article contains a list of the most studied restriction enzymes whose names start with O to R inclusive.  It contains approximately 130 enzymes.
The following information is given:



Whole list navigation

Restriction enzymes

O

P

R

Notes

Biotechnology
Restriction enzyme cutting sites
Restriction enzymes